Ólafur Eggert Júlíusson (born 11 July 1951) is a retired Icelandic football midfielder.

References

1951 births
Living people
Olafur Juliusson
Olafur Juliusson
Association football midfielders
Olafur Juliusson